The 1975–76 Toronto Toros season was the team's third season in Toronto, fourth of the franchise. The Toros missed the playoffs.

Regular season

Season standings

Game log

Player stats

Scoring leaders

Goaltending

Draft picks
Toronto's draft picks at the 1975 WHA Amateur Draft.

See also
 1975–76 WHA season

References

External links

Toronto
Toronto
Toronto Toros seasons